Neil Speaight (born 9 September 1978) is a British middle distance runner who currently resides in London, England.

Achievements

References

1978 births
Living people
British male middle-distance runners